Kristić is a patronymic surname found in Croatia and Serbia, and may refer to:

 Aleksandar Kristić (born 1970), Serbian former international footballer
 Matija Kristić (born 1978), Croatian football manager and former football defender
 Milan Kristić, Yugoslav football coach

See also
 Krištić
 Krstić

Croatian surnames
Serbian surnames